Carmaux is a railway station in Carmaux, Occitanie, France. The station opened in 1906. It is on the Toulouse to Rodez railway line. The station is served by Intercités de nuit (night train) and TER (local) services. The original station opened on 9 November 1857.

Train services
The following services currently call at Carmaux:
night services (Intercités de nuit) Paris–Orléans–Figeac–Rodez–Albi
local service (TER Occitanie) Toulouse–Albi–Rodez

References

Railway stations in Tarn (department)
Railway stations in France opened in 1857